Miguel Lourenço (born 7 February 1920, date of death unknown) was a Portuguese footballer who played as an outside forward.

Club career
Lourenço joined S.L. Benfica in 1939, going on to serve as back-up to both Alfredo Valadas and Guilherme Espírito Santo during his spell. He made his debut on 22 October 1939 in a 6–1 trashing of Carcavelinhos FC for the Campeonato de Lisboa, scoring his team's fourth goal on the 63rd minute. He would only reappear on 4 February 1940, when he took the place of Espírito Santo in a match against Leixões S.C. for the Primeira Divisão; despite failing to win the league, he helped the club conquer the Taça de Portugal and the Lisbon Championship, netting ten times in the process.

For the following season, 20-year old Lourenço played the majority of its games in the Portuguese Cup, featuring in just 12 matches and scoring six goals as Benfica failed to win any silverware. In 1941–42, his playing time was further reduced as he amassed just three scoreless appearances in the Lisbon Championship.

Lourenço left Benfica in 1942, signing for neighbouring club G.D. Estoril Praia two years later. He remained there until his retirement at the age of 33, eventually reaching the Portugal national team.

Honours
Benfica
Taça de Portugal: 1939–40
Campeonato de Lisboa: 1939–40

References
General
 

Specific

External links

1920 births
Year of death missing
Portuguese footballers
Association football forwards
Primeira Liga players
S.L. Benfica footballers
G.D. Estoril Praia players
Portugal international footballers